The Church of Saint Nichlaus, located in Stará Ľubovňa, is a Roman Catholic church dating from 1280. 

There are several works of art in its baroque interior, including a late 13th century triumphal arch, late–Gothic stone font, the figure of the “Ľubovňa Madonna” dated 1360, the Gothic sacrament-house, and the late–Gothic tombstones. 

Other historically valuable pieces are Baroque high altar to St Nicholas the Bishop, the side altars and a sculpture of the Mourning for Christ. Until 1780 there was a graveyard around the church. There are as-yet unexplored crypts beneath the church.

Churches in Prešov Region
13th-century Roman Catholic church buildings in Slovakia